Shukko (出向, from 出るmeaning to leave and 向う meaning to go towards) is a form of job transfer occurring in Japanese companies. A “Shukko” most often stands for a transfer of an employee from a main branch of a company to a branch office of the same company or an associated company. Rarely, it might be towards a non-affiliated company.

The main characteristic of the so-called “Japanese style of business administration” is lifetime employment (or 終身雇用). Shukko has a key role in the support and sustainment of this Japanese style of long term employment.

In Japan, Shukko has a negative reputation, because it is often used as a way to reduce personnel expenses. However Shukko has positive aspects – cases in which is used as a way to give employees the chance to gather corporate experience and broaden their careers.

Types of Shukko 

Each company makes their own conditions for Shukko.

Demotion 

This type is the main reason for the negative reputation of Shukko, because of its effect on personnel expenses. The Nenko System (seniority-based compensation) is the opposite of the merit-based wage system. Because pay is based solely on seniority, employees' salaries may not correspond with their job performance or ability.

External links
弁護士として公認会計士として金融庁出向経験は Asahi Judiciary  Retrieved March 24, 2014
リコー出向取り消しへ Nikkei.com  Retrieved July 19, 2014
 震災復興支援機構に出向して岩手県沿岸部で働いた経験　Journal of Law and Economics Retrieved April 21, 2014
出向という名の「追い出し部屋」　Asahi Shinbun Retrieved: July 14, 2013

References 

Japanese business terms